Saint Mary is a parish located in the northeast section of Jamaica. With a population of 114,227 it is one of Jamaica's smallest parishes, located in the county of Middlesex. Its chief town and capital is Port Maria, located on the coast. It is also the birthplace of established dancehall reggae artists, such as Capleton, Lady Saw, Ninjaman, Sizzla, and Tanya Stephens.  Other notable residents of St. Mary parish include bestselling author Colin Simpson, who is the great-great grandson of noted slavery abolitionist James Phillippo, famed Jamaican writer and community activist Erna Brodber, and acclaimed music producer Chris Blackwell who is credited with "discovering" Bob Marley.

History
There are a few traces of Taíno/Arawak presence in the parish. Saint Mary was also one of the first sections of the island to be occupied by the Spaniards. Puerto Santa Maria was the second town the Spaniards built on the island.  In 1655, after the English captured Jamaica from the Spanish, the north coastal town of Santa Maria became known as Port Maria.

One of St. Mary’s most famous early residents was Sir Henry Morgan, who had a home on the hill overlooking Port Maria.  The property offered a commanding view of the St. Mary harbour and provided Morgan with a strategic vantage point and featured a secret escape tunnel to Port Maria.  Morgan’s home was later purchased by Sir Noël Coward and is located beside Fort Haldane.

Fort Haldane was built in 1759 to protect the strategic harbour of Port Maria from Spanish raids.  It was also used as a garrison to keep the enslaved and working classes of St. Mary under control.  It was named after General George Haldane, then Governor of Jamaica. The fort’s cannons were strategically positioned on a hill facing seaward over Port Maria for protection. Fort Haldane served a pivotal role in the famous Tacky's rebellion, one of Jamaica's bloodiest rebellions against slavery in 1760. On Easter Sunday, a runaway slave known as Tacky and a small group of slaves from neighboring plantations murdered their masters and marched to Port Maria where they killed the guards at Fort Haldane and stole several barrels of gunpowder and firearms. They fought alongside hundreds of other slaves for five months but their rebellion was ultimately quashed by the British colonial authorities and the skilled Jamaican Maroons from Scott's Hall. A Maroon officer from Scott's Hall, Davy the Maroon, shot Tacky dead following a fierce gunbattle.

Descendants of the Maroons carried on their struggle after the abolition of slavery and they joined with Reverend James Phillippo in his quest to establish one of his Free Villages in St. Mary.  Phillippo built the first church in Oracabessa and led a defiant protest against the local landowner’s refusal to sell land to former slaves.  The Maroons joined Phillippo in a show of force that led to the landowner’s capitulation and the sale of enough land to build homes for the local population. St. Mary's present size was determined in 1867, when the parish of Metcalfe was merged with St Mary.

One of the largest landowners in Saint Mary at the turn of the 20th Century was Blanche Blackwell, mother of Chris Blackwell. Blanche sold plots of land from Oracabessa to Port Maria to her coterie of friends, including playwright Noël Coward, U.S. Ambassador Ruth Bryan Owen, and James Bond author Ian Fleming. Noël Coward's Firefly Estate is designated as a National Historic site, and overlooks St. Mary harbour.

The First James Bond film, Dr. No was filmed in part in st Mary including in the Oracabessa river.

In the 1990s, the Island Outpost Corporation developed one of St. Mary's best-known tourist attractions, the James Bond Beach and the facility includes a concert pavilion as well as a large bar/restaurant.

St. Mary is home to the Oracabessa Bay Fish Sanctuary, which was established in 2011 to protect the marine ecosystem in Oracabessa Bay. The eastern perimeter of the Oracabessa Bay Fish Sanctuary is located on the edge of the Cayman Trough with walls that begin at 60 ft. and drop down to over 150 ft. These walls are covered in a large variety of hard and soft corals. The walls contain many overhangs and ledges and are home to lobsters, king crab, green and spotted moray eels, and a host of other marine creatures.  Beyond the boundaries of the Oracabessa Bay Fish Sanctuary, the Cayman Trough plunges to depths of over 25,000 ft and is renowned for deep-water sport fishing including marlin and tuna.

Geography
St. Mary is located at latitude 18°09'N, longitude 77°03'W. It is bordered by Portland in the east, St. Ann in the west, and parts of St. Catherine and St. Andrew in the south.

The parish covers an area of 610 km2, making it Jamaica's fifth smallest parish. The terrain is mountainous, rising up to almost  at the highest point, but there are no distinctive mountain ranges. The climate is varied, like most parishes on the island. The eastern section of the parish has shale rock and an intricate surface draining pattern, while the western section is limestone with predominantly underground rivers.

There are three main rivers in Saint Mary, the Rio Nuevo, Wag Water River and White River.

Commerce
The parish has a good variety of agricultural resources. The principal products are bananas, sugar, citrus, pimento, cocoa, coconuts, coffee, vegetables, breadfruit and annatto. Pastoralism is also practised. In recent years, however, agriculture has been on the decline, which may be due to the problems that Jamaican banana export has been facing.

St. Mary's parish, had once been listed as one of the poorest in Jamaica, but over the past 10 years there have been substantial improvements in the economy due to the influx of investments in infrastructure, including a new international airport (Ian Fleming International Airport), a new highway, and development of luxury resorts such as Goldeneye and Golden Clouds. The new intercoastal highway constructed in 2005 has benefitted the parish and has brought a significant increase to tourism-related activities.

The parish boasts what is thought by some to be one of the best secondary level schools in the nation, St Mary High School, from which several outstanding people have come. They occupy several reputable positions in varying sectors both at home and overseas.

Essential services includes banking and postal services. There are hospitals located in Port Maria and Annotto Bay, as well as public health clinics in Highgate, Oracabessa and Boscobel.

Tourism
Tourism has become an increasingly important source of income for parishioners of St. Mary. Some of the most well known resorts in St. Mary include Couples Sans Souci, Couples Tower Isle, Beaches Boscobel, Goldeneye and Golden Clouds.  Ian Fleming International Airport provides private jet service for these luxurious properties as well as emergency airlift and general passenger service.  Two of the most popular beaches in St. Mary are James Bond Beach and Reggae Beach.

Politics 
Saint Mary Parish is covered by three parliamentary constituencies:

 Saint Mary Central
 Saint Mary South Eastern
 Saint Mary Western

Notable people

Notable people who live or have lived in Saint Mary parish include:
 Esther Anderson, filmmaker, actress
 Aleen Bailey, Olympic gold-medal winner
 Chris Blackwell, award-winning music producer
 Ruth Bryan Owen, U.S. Ambassador
 Capleton, reggae and dancehall artist
 Noël Coward, award-winning playwright
 Christine Day, Olympic medalist
 Stephen deRoux, professional soccer player
 Clancy Eccles, ska and reggae singer
 Ian Fleming, bestselling author
 Andy Hamilton, jazz saxophonist and composer
 Beres Hammond, reggae singer
 Lisa Hanna, Member of Parliament, Minister of Youth and Culture, Miss Jamaica World 1993, Miss World 1993
 Perry Henzell, movie director
 Ini Kamoze, reggae singer
 Kiddus I, reggae singer
 Lady Saw, Grammy-award winning DJ and reggae singer
 Audrey Marks, Jamaican ambassador to the U.S.
 Beverly McDonald, Olympic gold-medal winner
 Danny McFarlane, Olympic medalist 
 Count Prince Miller, actor and musician
 Ninjaman, dancehall DJ
 Pan Head, ragga-dancehall DJ
 Georgianna Robertson, fashion model and actress
 Oliver Samuels, Comedian
 Colin Simpson, bestselling author and musician
 Tanya Stephens, reggae singer
 Admiral Tibet, dancehall singer and recording artist
 Richard Von White, internationally renowned artist
 Josey Wales, dancehall DJ

References

External links
Oracabessa Website
Ian Fleming International Airport Website

 
Parishes of Jamaica